Alakdana (International title: Scorpion Lady) is a 2011 Philippine television drama fantasy romance series broadcast by GMA Network. Directed by Mac Alejandre, it stars Louise delos Reyes, Paulo Avelino and Alden Richards. It premiered on January 24, 2011 on the network's Dramarama sa Hapon line up replacing Ang Yaman ni Lola. The series concluded on May 13, 2011 with a total of 78 episodes. It was replaced by Blusang Itim in its timeslot.

The series is streaming online on YouTube.

Cast and characters

Lead cast
 Louise delos Reyes as Adana San Miguel Madrigal 
 Paulo Avelino as Billy Yaneza
 Alden Richards as Jomari "Joma" Perez

Supporting cast
 Jean Garcia as Teresa San Miguel-Madrigal
 Matthew Mendoza as Vergel Madrigal
 Jobelle Salvador as Zoila Madrigal
 Jhoana Marie Tan as Veronica Madrigal
 Ritchie Paul Gutierrez as Gabriel Geronimo
 Perla Bautista as Ising Perez
 Racquel Montesa as Olga Gaston 
 Ian de Leon as Rico Romero 
 Karla Estrada as Greta Yaneza
 Gwen Zamora as Rachel Dinagul / Krista Eisenhower
 Jan Manual as Vic
 Eunice Lagusad as Weng

Guest cast
 Mariel Pamintuan as young Adana 
 Randy Frosca as young Joma
 Menggie Cobarubias as Vergel's father
 Baby O'brien as Vergel's mother
 Carmen Soriano as Zoila's mother

Ratings
According to AGB Nielsen Philippines' Mega Manila People/Individual television ratings, the pilot episode of Alakdana earned an 8.1% rating. While the final episode scored a 16.6% rating in Mega Manila household television ratings.

Accolades

References

External links
 

2011 Philippine television series debuts
2011 Philippine television series endings
Fantaserye and telefantasya
Filipino-language television shows
GMA Network drama series
Philippine romance television series
Television shows set in the Philippines